Last Ghost Standing is a 1999 Hong Kong film directed by Billy Chung. The film is an adaptation of the novel by Simon Lui.

Cast
 Sherming Yiu - Yiu-yiu
 Simon Lui Yue Yeung - Yang Yang
 Pauline Suen - Officer Suen
 Lai Yiu Cheung - Clerk Cheung
 Amanda Lee Wai-Man - Popcorn Clerk
 Angela Tong - Yen Yen
 Pinky Cheung - Pinky
 Benny Chan - Stoner
 Francis Ng - The Ghost
 Ng Chi Hung - Raymond Company Agent
 Chin Kar Lok - Jackie Chan Impersonator

External links

 HK cinemagic entry

1999 films
1990s Cantonese-language films
1990s supernatural horror films
Films based on Chinese novels
1999 horror films
Hong Kong supernatural horror films
1990s Hong Kong films